Rocket to Russia is the third studio album by the American punk rock band the Ramones, and was released on November 4, 1977, through Sire Records. Its origins date back to the summer of 1977, when "Sheena Is a Punk Rocker" was released as a single. That summer was known as the peak of the punk rock genre since many punk bands were offered recording contracts. The album's recording began in August 1977, and the band had a considerably larger budget with Sire allowing them between $25,000 and $30,000; much of this money went toward the album's production rather than recording.

The album's cover art was directed by John Gillespie. John Holmstrom and guitarist Johnny Ramone both worked on illustration, with the entire back cover contemplating a military theme, while the inner sleeve artwork depicted many of the themes portrayed in songs. The subject matter of songs varied throughout the album, though nearly all the tracks on the album incorporated humor into the lyrics. The musical style showed more of a surf rock influence, and many songs had minimal structuring.

The album received positive reviews, with many critics appreciating the matured production and sound quality as compared to Rocket to Russias predecessors. Music critic Stephen Thomas Erlewine called it his favorite Ramones album as it contained several hooks and featured more variety of tempos. The album was not as commercially successful as the band had hoped, peaking at number 49 on the Billboard 200. Band members blamed the Sex Pistols for their lack of sales, saying that they changed the punk image for the worse. This is the last album to be recorded with all four original members as credited performers, as drummer Tommy Ramone left the band in 1978 to work solely on production. The album was ranked at number 106 in Rolling Stones "500 Greatest Albums of All Time" in 2012, and was ranked number 385 in the 2020 edition.

 Background 
In the summer of 1977, the single "Sheena Is a Punk Rocker" was released shortly after the release of the band's second album, Leave Home. This period was extremely significant to the punk rock genre, as it was the initial wave of New York City's underground punk bands receiving recording contracts. New York-based clubs CBGB and Max's Kansas City began to see bigger audiences crowd in to hear these bands. Punk fans commonly believed that this musical style would soon top the market, to which author Tom Carson explains: "To be in New York that summer was to have some sense of what it might have been like to live in San Francisco in 1966 or '67, or in London when the Beatles and the [Rolling] Stones first hit."

 Recording and production 
Sire Records allowed the band between $25,000 and $30,000 to fully record and produce the album, which is a considerably larger budget compared to the band's previous albums. The band spent most of the money Sire had given them on the album's production value. The studio rent was $150 per hour, usually using the first take of a song as its final recording. Johnny explained that "it's best to do it quickly ... You do not wanna sit there and bullshit. It's your money they're spending."

The recording began on August 21, 1977 and took place in Midtown Manhattan at Mediasound Studios, a premises of a former Episcopalian Church. On the first day of sessions, guitarist Johnny Ramone brought a copy of the Sex Pistols' single "God Save the Queen" with him, remarking that their type of music "robbed" the band. He emphasized that the album's sound engineer Ed Stasium needed to incorporate better production than that of the Sex Pistols, to which Stasium replied "no problem". Johnny relates: "These guys ripped us off and I want to sound better than this."

Though the album cites Tony Bongiovi and Tommy Ramone (credited as T. Erdelyi) as the head producers, much of the album's production was done by Stasium; Johnny went so far as to insist that Bongiovi was "not even there" during the band's recording sessions. Rocket to Russias final mastering was mainly done in Bongiovi's Power Station studio. Infamous record producer Phil Spector offered to fabricate Rocket to Russia, but the band declined, feeling as though the album would not be the same without Tommy and Bongiovi.

 Title and packaging 

The album was released on November 4, 1977, under the name Rocket to Russia, though it had a working title of Get Well. John Gillespie directed the artwork on the album, and the cover photo was taken by Danny Fields. Arturo Vega is credited as Artistic Coordinator, and Punk magazine editor John Holmstrom illustrated for the album. Holmstrom and Johnny collaborated on the back cover's concept, eventually conceiving a military theme with an anti-communist cartoon drawing. The back cover art depicts a "pinhead" riding a rocket from the US to Russia. The drawing features many landmarks which pertain to their global position, including The Empire State Building and Capitol Building, and Saint Basil's Cathedral in Moscow. The original artwork is now featured in the Rock and Roll Hall of Fame in Cleveland, Ohio. The inside sleeve features cartoon illustrations of each song's basic concept.Leigh 1994, p. 258.

 Lyrics and composition 
Compared to the band's previous albums, the songs from Rocket to Russia were more surf music and bubblegum pop influenced. But similar to their previous releases, the lyrics integrated humor, specifically black comedy with themes circling mental disorders and psychiatry.

The album opens with "Cretin Hop", which pays homage to Ramones fans, and was inspired by Cretin Avenue of St. Paul, Minnesota, named after former bishop Joseph Crétin. When the piece was performed at concerts, the band would pogo dance on stage. "Rockaway Beach" was written by bassist Dee Dee Ramone, and was inspired by the Beach Boys along with other surf music bands. The title refers to a neighborhood and beach in Queens which Dee Dee was a fan of, as confirmed by Tommy and Joey. "I Don't Care" is composed of three chords and features minimal text composition. The song is among the first pieces written by the band and was originally recorded as a demo that was released on the 2001 expanded edition of the Ramones debut album. "Sheena Is a Punk Rocker" was written by Joey, who explains that the lyrics are about a young female outsider named Sheena who strayed away from the popular disco and surf music and instead visited nightclubs and listened to punk rock. The mid-tempo song deviates from a three-chord pattern and starts off with Dee Dee shouting "Four!", which, according to engineer Ed Stasium, was the result of Dee Dee starting his iconic countdown before the tape started rolling. This is followed by guitar riffs deemed to have a "raucous" texture by author Tom Carson. The author also suggests that these chords "bump[ed]" into each other until the song's fade-out ending.Marcus 2007, p. 108

"We're a Happy Family" is a caricature of the conditions which 20th-century middle-class American families lived in. The song's lyrics depict a dysfunctional family where the father is a lying homosexual, the mother is addicted to prescription drugs, the infant has chills. The writing also tells of how the family are friends with the President of the United States and the Pope and indicate that the family sells "dope". The song fades out with various different lines taken from fake dialogue, which illustrate a side of Joey's personality according to his brother Mickey Leigh.

Side B of the album begins with "Teenage Lobotomy", which deals with the brain surgical operation lobotomy. The lyrics outline how this procedure can cause serious consequences to the brain, with the line "Gonna get my Ph.D, I'm a teenage lobotomy." The composition features more complex melodies than that of other songs from the album, with Stasium proclaiming it to be a "mini-Ramones Symphony". Rocket to Russia is the first album to feature two cover songs: "Do You Wanna Dance?" (originally performed by Bobby Freeman) and "Surfin' Bird" (originally performed by the Trashmen).

 Critical reception 

Rocket to Russia was well received by critics, and was often given a positive review. Many critics appreciated the band's progression of sound quality and production value, as opposed to the album's predecessors. Stephen Thomas Erlewine, a music critic at AllMusic said that the production "only gives the Ramones' music more force." He rewarded the album five out of five stars, stating that although it lacks the revolutionary impact that their debut had, Rocket to Russia is the band's "most listenable and enjoyable album" because of its surplus of hooks and varying tempo.

Critic Robert Christgau reaffirms that the album's content evolved significantly since previous releases. Writing in Christgau's Record Guide: Rock Albums of the Seventies (1981), he noted that the album had "something for everyone" and called it a "ready-made punk-rock classic." Rolling Stone critic Dave Marsh began his review of the album by stating: "Rocket to Russia is the best American rock & roll of the year and possibly the funniest rock album ever made." Like other critics, Marsh recognized the advanced sound quality, explaining that "the guitars still riff relentlessly, but they are freer within the murky sound, and the songs give them much more to work with." John Rockwell of The New York Times deemed Rocket to Russia the band's best album "because the humor and the role-playing have become more overt than ever."

 Commercial performance 
Though the band expected the album to spawn a few hit songs, Rocket to Russia sold few records. The album charted on the US Billboard 200 at number 49, making this album one of the most successful of the Ramones' releases. It also debuted at number 31 on the Swedish charts, 36 on the Canadian charts, and 60 on the UK Albums Chart.

The lack of record sales was largely due to the fellow punk band Sex Pistols turning people off the genre "with their antisocial behavior," as put by author Brian J. Bowe. Rock music historian Legs McNeil relates: "Safety pins, razor blades, chopped haircuts, snarling, vomiting—everything that had nothing to do with the Ramones was suddenly in vogue, and it killed any chance Rocket to Russia had of getting any airplay." Joey also insisted that the Sex Pistols were partially responsible for the low sale numbers, concluding that before 60 Minutes focused on the Sex Pistols, Rocket to Russia had decent airplay. After this, Joey asserted that "everyone flipped out and then things changed radically. It really kind of screwed things up for ourselves."

 Tommy's departure 
Drummer Tommy, who had also worked to co-produce the album, was troubled by the lack of sales and began debating on continuing with the Ramones. He also considered touring to be "depressing", and that the audience at unfamiliar gigs were "a bunch of very eccentric, high-strung, crazy people, from one shit-hole club to another." The drummer left the band in 1978 but continued as producer on their next album Road to Ruin. He said:

 Track listing 
Original release
All tracks originally credited to the Ramones (except "Do You Wanna Dance?" and "Surfin' Bird"). Actual writers are listed alongside the tracks.

Track 15 previously unissued.
Track 16 produced and arranged by Dan Kessel and David Kessel. Recorded at Gold Star Studios, Los Angeles, December 1978. First issued on All the Stuff (And More) Volume Two (1991).

2017 40th anniversary deluxe edition (Sire/Rhino)
Adapted from the album's liner notes.
 Disc 1Remastered original mixes
Tracks 1–14 (original mixes) as per original album

Tracks 15-28 mixed by Ed Stasium at Eight Palms Ranchero, Poway, California, 2017.Disc 2Tracks 1-12 mixed by Ed Stasium at Mediasound and the Power Station, New York, 1977.
Tracks 13-19 and 24 mixed by Ed Stasium, 2017.
Track 21 produced by Tony Bongiovi and T. Erdelyi, engineered by Ed Stasium. Recorded at Sundragon, New York, 1976. Mixed by Ed Stasium at Mediasound, New York, 1977.
Track 22 produced by Tony Bongiovi and T. Erdelyi, engineered by Ed Stasium, assisted by Don Berman. Recorded at Mediasound, New York, 1977. Mixed by Ed Stasium.
Track 23: Joey's voice recorded at Sire Records' basement studio, October 1977.
All tracks, except 21 and 22, previously unissued.Disc 3Recorded by the Basing Street Studios Mobile. Engineered by Frank Owen, assisted by Greg Cobb. Mixed by Ed Stasium at Eight Palms Ranch, Poway, California, 2017.LP40th anniversary tracking mix
 Track listing as disc 1, tracks 15–28

 Personnel 
Adapted from AllMusic and the album's liner notes, except where noted.Ramones Joey Ramone – lead vocals
 Johnny Ramone – guitar
 Dee Dee Ramone – bass guitar, backing vocals
 Tommy Ramone – drumsAdditional musicians Ed Stasium – additional guitar, backing vocals 
 Kathie Baillie – backing vocals on "Sheena Is a Punk Rocker"
 Alan LeBoeuf – backing vocals on "Sheena Is a Punk Rocker"
 Michael Bonagura – backing vocals on "Sheena Is a Punk Rocker"Production Tony Bongiovi – producer
 Tommy Ramone – producer (credited as T. Erdelyi)
 Ed Stasium – engineer, mixing
 Don Berman – assistant engineer
 Greg Calbi – mastering
 Danny Fields – photography (front cover)
 John Gillespie – art direction  
 John Holmstrom – artwork (back cover and inside drawings)
 Arturo Vega – artistic coordination

Charts

 References CitationsBibliography'

Further reading 
 
 
 
 

1977 albums
Ramones albums
Sire Records albums
Rhino Records albums
Albums produced by Tony Bongiovi
Albums produced by Tommy Ramone